Dodda Jakkanahalli is a village in the southern state of Karnataka, India. It is located in the Nagamangala taluk of Mandya district in Karnataka.

Approximately 80 families live in Dodda Jakkana Halli, where the main source of income is through agriculture and Dairy. Coconuts and vegetables are also exported from this village to Bangalore & Mysore.

Institutions within the village include the milk dairy, Anganwadi, veterinary hospital, Library and Government Primary School.

A popular meeting place for locals is harali katte and nearby shop which is run by one of the popular local lady Gaviyamma. In this shop, Coffee, Tea, toiletries and kids selection sweets are available.

Cricket is a popular sport in the village.

The Village Dodda Jakkana Halli is also known for its temples. The Padaladhamma Temple and the shani mahatma temples are more popular in the region. There's also an Anjaneya temple and Maramma temple within the village.

The main icon of the Village is Govina Katte which is located entrance of the village.

(Source:Girish Chikkathimmaiah)

Villages in Mandya district